Daphnis and Chloe, is a 1931 Greek romance film written and directed by Orestis Laskos, based on the namesake novel of the 2nd-century writer Longus. It is sometimes said to be the first European film containing nude scenes. The 1897 film by George Méliès After The Ball was much earlier, but uses simulated nudity via use of body stockings.

The film was shot in different areas on the island of Lesvos namely Mytilini and Agiasos.  The Nymph scenes were shot at Lake Vouliagmeni in Corinth.  The original silent film negatives were burned.  There were talking copies produced after the 1940s one was found in the United States with English subtitles and speech.  The Greek film library conservation and restoration department in collaboration with the original director's supervision restored the silent film to its original quality.  

The film was made at the height of the Greek film era between 1925 and 1935.  During this time over forty feature films were produced in Greece.  The Greek film was also one of the first script-written films for cinema and adapted from the Ancient Greek story by Lungos.  Famous Greek actor Kimon Spathopoulos contributed his knowledge as a make-up artist.

Plot
The story follows the traditional story of Daphnis and Chloe.  A shepherd character named Lamon, finds a young boy sucking milk from one of its goats.  He calls the boy Daphnis and adopts the boy as his child.  Around the same time, another shepherd Dryas finds a young girl named Chloe and adopts her.  Both children are raised as shepherds.  In the film Daphnis and Chloe, the two small shepherds, grow up together in the mountains of the ancient Greek island of Lesbos and with the arrival of puberty.  The children began to have sexual desires.  The children become confused and agitated.  They do not know how to respond to the call of the flesh. A young prince persistently desires Chloe but she is finally saved by Daphne who violently intervenes. Daphnis is arrested and sentenced to be flogged to death but at the last moment, it is revealed that the young shepherd, who had been abandoned as an infant in the forest, belongs to a noble family. Daphnis asks to marry his beloved, but now new class barriers are erected, until the final revelation that Chloe is also of noble birth. The two young people are now free to express their love.

Analysis
The film by Laskos presented a series of firsts. It moved the lens while shooting. The shooting style was usually the camera staying still at the time. He used the new style in the scene of the nymphs that was filmed in Lake Vouliagmeni in Corinth. He also used panchromatic film, which gave many shades of black and white, in contrast to the orthochromatic film which gave pure white-black shades. Finally, the first of any other European film directors, Laskos presented a nude actor, which is why when the film was released it was labeled by some as pornography.  Chloe's costumes were the same as those used in the Delphic Festivals.

The actors were amateurs and the protagonists, the Greek-American dancer Lousi (Loukia) Matli - and Apollo Marsyas (pseudonym of the later photographer Edison Vichos) were presented by the production as "young people of ancient Greek profile".  Laskos fell in love with Loukia spontaneously and falsely.   The film was shot in Lesvos, the place where the story of Daphne and Chloe took place, specifically in Agiasos, except for the nymph scenes, which for cost reasons were shot in Lake Vouliagmeni.

The original print and negatives of the film were lost for many years. At some point they were in the United States, that's why there were English subtitles in some parts of it. The film was restored by the technical service of the film archive of Greece in 1992, with the cooperation of the director.

The film remains faithful to the ancient work. It was based on the translation of the original by Ilias Voutieridis, published in 1922.  The bucolic landscape was satisfactorily represented and the heroes were dressed in ancient fashion. The film offers discrepancies: Laskos did not add the raid of the bandits and the Mithymnians, due to high production costs.

Cast
 Apollon Marsyas aka (Edison Vichos) as Daphnis
 Lucy Matli as Chloe
 Ioannis Avlonitis as Dryas  
 Grigoris Georgiadis as Lamon
 Korina Hatzimihelaki as Lycaenion
 K. Pavlopoulos as Megacles
 Giangos Lambrakis as Dionysophanes

See Also
The Adventures of Villar
Astero (1929)

References

Bibliography

External links

1931 romantic drama films
1931 in Greece
Films directed by Orestis Laskos
Films based on Greek novels
Greek black-and-white films
Films based on classical mythology
Greek romantic drama films
Films shot in Lesbos
1931 films
Works based on Daphnis and Chloe
Greek silent films